is a Japanese woman convicted of putting poison in a pot of curry being served at a 1998 summer festival in the Sonobe district of Wakayama, Wakayama, Japan.

Crime
A communal pot of curry being served to residents of Sonobe district, Wakayama, was poisoned with at least 1,000 grams of arsenic — enough to kill over 100 people — on July 25, 1998.

Two children and two adults died after consuming the curry, and 63 others suffered from acute arsenic poisoning. Killed in the incident were 64-year-old Takatoshi Taninaka and 53-year-old Takaaki Tanaka (council president and vice president of Wakayama, respectively), 10-year-old Hirotaka Hayashi, and 16-year-old Miyuki Torii.

Attention quickly focused on 37-year-old mother of four Masumi Hayashi, as a witness had seen her at the curry pot, and she had easy access to arsenic because her husband was an insect exterminator. Prior to the murders, Hayashi had been an insurance saleswoman. After her arrest, she and her husband were indicted on a number of insurance fraud charges as well. Hayashi has also tried for three other, attempted murders by poison that had occurred during the previous 10 years, with the motive in those cases being life-insurance benefits. She is believed to have tried to kill her husband at least once. Her motive for poisoning the curry has been said to be anger at her neighbours for shunning her family. The arsenic found in the curry was identical to the arsenic she had in her own home from her husband's extermination business.

Trial
At her trial she pleaded innocent, but Wakayama District Court sentenced her to death in 2002. On June 28, 2005, Osaka High Court upheld her death sentence. However, her lawyers (Yoshihiro Yasuda among them) insisted on her innocence because only circumstantial evidence existed.

On April 21, 2009, the Supreme Court of Japan rejected her final appeal.

In July 2009, Hayashi formally petitioned for a retrial. Wakayama District Court rejected her petition in March 2017. Hayashi appealed to Osaka High Court by April 2017, but the request was rejected.  A third petition for retrial was filed in June 2021.

Impact
Hayashi's case gained public attention. The crime inspired a wave of copycat poisonings.

On June 9, 2021, Masumi's 37-year-old daughter jumped off a bridge at Kansai Airport, killing herself and her 4-year-old daughter.  Her 16-year-old daughter was found bludgeoned to death earlier the same day.

References

External links
New York Times story about her conviction
Poisonous Year for Japan BBC
Japan poison arrests BBC
Stampede at curry poison trial BBC

1961 births
Mass murder in 1998
1998 in Japan
Japanese mass murderers
Japanese murderers of children
Japanese fraudsters
Living people
People from Wakayama Prefecture
Poisoners
Japanese female murderers
Japanese prisoners sentenced to death
Prisoners sentenced to death by Japan
Japanese people convicted of murder
People convicted of murder by Japan
Mass murder in Japan
Women sentenced to death